Is There Justice? is a 1931 American pre-Code crime film directed by Stuart Paton and starring Rex Lease, Henry B. Walthall and Blanche Mehaffey. It is now considered a lost film.

Synopsis
The brother of woman who died in jail seeks revenge on the district attorney by getting hold of a photograph of his daughter dancing on a table on her underwear.

Cast
 Rex Lease as Jerry Heath 
 Henry B. Walthall as District Attorney John Raymond 
 Blanche Mehaffey as Kay Raymond 
 Robert Ellis as Dan Lawrence 
 Helen Foster as June Lawrence 
 Ernie Adams as Shorty Gray 
 Joseph W. Girard as Chief of Police 
 Richard Cramer as Detective Regan 
 John Ince as Dr. Gibbs 
 Walter Brennan as Rollins

References

Bibliography
 Larry Langman & Daniel Finn. A Guide to American Crime Films of the Thirties. Greenwood Press, 1995.

External links
 

1931 films
1931 crime films
American crime films
Films directed by Stuart Paton
1930s English-language films
1930s American films